The 2020–21 Mississippi State Bulldogs men's basketball team represented Mississippi State University during the 2020–21 NCAA Division I men's basketball season. The team was led by sixth-year head coach Ben Howland, and played their home games at Humphrey Coliseum in Starkville, Mississippi as a member of the Southeastern Conference. In a season limited due to the ongoing COVID-19 pandemic, they finished the season 18–15, 8–10 in SEC play to finish in ninth place. They defeated Kentucky in the second round of the SEC tournament before losing to Alabama in the quarterfinals. They received an invitation to the National Invitation Tournament as the fourth seed in the Saint Louis bracket. There they defeated Saint Louis, Richmond, and Louisiana Tech to advance the championship game where they lost to Memphis.

Previous season
The Bulldogs finished the 2019–20 season 20–11, 11–7 in SEC play to finish in a tie for fourth place. They were set to be the No. 4 seed in the SEC tournament with a bye to the quarterfinals. However, the SEC Tournament and all other postseason tournaments were canceled due to the ongoing COVID-19 pandemic.

Offseason

Departures

Roster

Schedule and results

|-
!colspan=12 style=|Non-conference regular season

|-
!colspan=12 style=|SEC regular season

|-
!colspan=12 style=| SEC Tournament

|-
!colspan=12 style=| NIT

Source

References

Mississippi State Bulldogs men's basketball seasons
Mississippi State Bulldogs
Mississippi State Bulldogs men's basketball
Mississippi State Bulldogs men's basketball
Mississippi State